Pseudominolia climacota is a species of sea snail, a marine gastropod mollusk in the family Trochidae, the top snails.

The epithet "climacota" is derived from the Greek word for "terraced".

Description
The height of the shell attains 14 mm, its diameter also 14 mm. The solid shell has a gradate conical shape. It is subdepressed and narrowly umbilicate,. Its color is white-ochraceous or white-cinereous. The shell contains seven whorls with much impressed sutures. The whorls are irregularly spirally deeply lirate. The lirae are conspicuously sulculose with triangular blotches of black-brown painting. The smooth base is plane but triangular at the periphery. Below the periphery it is ornated with brown to ashy gray flames. The aperture is angulated round with a simple lip.

Distribution
This marine species occurs off Iran.

References

External links
 To World Register of Marine Species

 climacota
Gastropods described in 1897